Ravi Pandey is an Indian film actor. He is mainly known for his roles in Manikarnika, Bhaukaal and Sallu Ki Shadi.

Early life 
Pandey was born in Sultanpur and brought up in Etawah, Uttar Pradesh. In an interview with Times of India, pandey stated "I left my MBA studies in 2002 and joined the theatre to learn the nuances of acting with Rajesh Dua ji and Arun Mathur ji and played lead characters in many plays."

Personal life 
He is married to Monika Pandey.
Parents Mr.Laxmi Narayan Pandey & Mrs Sushila pandey 
Brother & Sister : Mr.Arvind Pandey / Mrs Neelam tiwari & Mrs Manju Pandey

Career 
In 2010, Pandey made his debut in Hindi film industry with the film "Admission open" starring Anupam Kher and Ashish Vidyarthi. In the same year he played a role as DJ rodger in Benny and Babloo.

In 2011, he acted as ram in Shahrukh Khan starrer Ra-one. In 2018, he played a second lead character in the film Sallu Ki Shadi.

In 2019, Pandey played a noted character as bakshish Ali in Manikarnika starring Kanganna Ranaut.

In 2020, he played a prominent role (Salim Khan) in web series Bhaukaal.

In 2021 , he played a prominent role ( kaamat) in web series Chakravyuh - An Inspector Virkar crime thriller

Filmography

References

External links 
 

Indian film actors
Living people
Year of birth missing (living people)